Tom Dickson (born September 22, 1945) is an American politician. He is a former member of the Georgia House of Representatives from the 6th District, serving from 2005 to 2017. He is a member of the Republican party. He appeared in the 2011 film Bully after one of his constituents, 17-year-old Tyler Long, committed suicide.

References

Living people
Republican Party members of the Georgia House of Representatives
1945 births
21st-century American politicians